Head Case is a 2007 pseudo-documentary film (cinéma vérité) horror film written and directed by Anthony Spadaccini.

The film is presented as a collection of home movies from serial killers Wayne and Andrea Montgomery, middle-class suburban residents of Claymont, Delaware who film their sadistic crimes.

Cast
 Paul McCloskey as Wayne Montgomery
 Barbara Lessin as Andrea Montgomery
 Brinke Stevens as Julie
 Bruce De Santis as Todd Montgomery
 Emily Spiegel as Monica Montgomery
 Michael J. Panichelli, Jr. as Detective John Haynes

External links
 

2007 films
Found footage films
American serial killer films
Films set in Delaware
2007 horror films
2000s English-language films
2000s American films